The Inter-State Building is a six-story commercial building in the central business district of Kansas City, Missouri that was built during 1914–15. It was listed on the National Register of Historic Places in 2008.

It was designed by Kansas City, Missouri architect James C. Sunderland in Chicago style.

References

Commercial buildings completed in 1915
Buildings and structures in Jackson County, Missouri
Commercial buildings on the National Register of Historic Places in Missouri
National Register of Historic Places in Jackson County, Missouri
Chicago school architecture in Missouri